Ila Arun is an Indian actress, TV personality and Rajasthani folk and folk-pop singer. She has appeared in many prominent Bollywood movies such as Lamhe, Jodhaa Akbar, Shaadi Ke Side Effects and Begum Jaan.

Personal life
Arun was born on 15 March 1954 in Jodhpur in Rajasthan. She hails from Jaipur . She is the sister of Piyush Pandey and Prasoon Pandey. Her mother was Bhagwati Pandey. Ila Arun is the mother Ishita Arun.

Playback singing
Arun has sung numerous film songs in Hindi and quite a few South Indian languages such as Tamil and Telugu. Her most famous film song to date has been "Choli Ke Peeche" sung along with Alka Yagnik for the film Khalnayak starring Madhuri Dixit, for which they won the Filmfare Award for Best Female Playback Singer. Another song which she is famous for is "Ghup Chup" from the film Karan Arjun. She also is well known for her song "Morni Baaga Ma Bole" accompanied with Lata Mangeshkar, in the movie Lamhe, starring Sridevi. She has lent her voice to the Tamil song "Muthu Muthu Mazhai", for the film Mr. Romeo, composed by A. R. Rahman. Her last noteworthy song was also with Rahman composed for the internationally acclaimed film Slumdog Millionaire, called "Ringa Ringa".

Singles/Albums
She has produced several successful singles such as "Vote for Ghagra". She also sang the promotional hit song Halla Bol for the Rajasthan Royals team in the Indian Premier League She hails from Rajasthan and sings Rajasthani songs in her albums and movies.

Acting
Arun was first seen acting in Lifeline (Jeevanrekha) a Hindi TV serial on life of doctors, along with Tanvi Azmi on Doordarshan. She delivered an electrifying performance in the 2008 hit Jodhaa Akbar as Maham Anga, Akbar's shrewd wet nurse and political advisor. She has also acted in supporting roles in films such as China Gate, Chingari, Well Done Abba, Welcome to Sajjanpur, West is West and Ghatak. In Shaadi Ke Side Effects and Begum Jaan, she played a governess and a brothel member, respectively.  In "Raat Akeli Hai", which is a Netflix movie and released on 31 July 2020, she has played the role of mother of the Hero "Nawazuddin Siddiqui" and correctly delivered the dialogues in local dialect.

Arun has been a part of the early years of Indian television Industry, acting in the 1980s Bharat Ek Khoj and Yatra. She also took on the role of Hansa Mehta, an independence activist who was part of the advisory committee of the constituent assembly, in Samvidhaan which is a TV mini-series based on the making of the Constitution of India.

Discography

Filmography

As Actress

As Singer

As Music Director
1992 – Mujhse Dosti Karoge
1991 – Rukmavati Ki Haveli
1985 – Doongar Ro Bhed

Television Appearances

References

External links

 
 

1954 births
Living people
Actresses from Jaipur
Musicians from Jaipur
Singers from Rajasthan
Women musicians from Rajasthan
Rajasthani people
Indian folk singers
Indian women folk singers
Hindi-language singers
Bollywood playback singers
Tamil playback singers
Indian women playback singers
Indian folk-pop singers
Indian film actresses
Indian television actresses
Indian stage actresses
Actresses in Hindi cinema
Actresses in Hindi television
Filmfare Awards winners
Indian expatriate actresses in the United Kingdom
20th-century Indian actresses
21st-century Indian actresses
20th-century Indian women singers
20th-century Indian singers
21st-century Indian women singers
21st-century Indian singers